Ernst Geerling (25 July 1909 – 18 August 1971) was a German sprinter. He competed in the men's 100 metres at the 1932 Summer Olympics.

References

1909 births
1971 deaths
Athletes (track and field) at the 1932 Summer Olympics
German male sprinters
Olympic athletes of Germany
Sportspeople from Frankfurt